The 1990 VIII ACB International Tournament "VII Memorial Héctor Quiroga" was the 8th semi-official edition of the European Basketball Club Super Cup. It took place at Pabellón Municipal de Puerto Real, Puerto Real, Spain, on 7, 8 and 9 September 1990 with the participations of POP 84 (champions of the 1989–90 FIBA European Champions Cup), FC Barcelona Banca Catalana (runners-up of the 1989–90 FIBA European Champions Cup and champions of the 1989–90 Liga ACB), Montigalà Joventut (champions of the 1989–90 FIBA Korać Cup) and Maccabi Elite Tel Aviv (champions of the 1989–90 Premier League).

League stage
Day 1, September 7, 1990

|}

Day 2, September 8, 1990

|}

Day 3, September 9, 1990

|}

Final standings

References 

European Basketball Club Super Cup
1990–91 in European basketball
1990–91 in Spanish basketball
1990–91 in Israeli basketball
1990–91 in Yugoslav basketball
International basketball competitions hosted by Spain